The Cosmik Chaser is a British ultralight trike that was designed by Nigel Beale and is produced by Cosmik Aviation of Southam. The aircraft is supplied as a complete ready-to-fly-aircraft.

Design and development
The Chaser was a competition trike that won dozens of international matches in the 1990s and then went out of production, as UK regulations changed.  It was reintroduced circa 2010 as regulations were again altered, as a made-to-order and unadvertised product of the company.

The Chaser features a cable-braced hang glider-style high-wing, weight-shift controls, a single-seat open cockpit, tricycle landing gear and a single engine in pusher configuration.

The aircraft is made from bolted-together aluminum tubing, with its wing covered in Dacron sailcloth. Its  span wing is supported by a single tube-type kingpost and uses an "A" frame weight-shift control bar. The powerplant is a twin cylinder, air-cooled, two-stroke,  Rotax 447 engine.

An updated model, called the Superchaser, was proposed.

Specifications (Chaser)

References

External links

1990s British sport aircraft
1990s British ultralight aircraft
Single-engined pusher aircraft
Ultralight trikes